Anna Elbina Morpurgo Davies,  (21 June 1937 – 27 September 2014) was an Italian philologist who specialised in comparative Indo-European linguistics. She spent her career at Oxford University, where she was the Professor of Comparative Philology and Fellow of Somerville College.

Personal life and education
Anna Elbina Morpurgo was born in Milan, the fourth child of a Jewish family. Her grandfather Guido Castelnuovo was a mathematician; her father, Augusto Morpurgo, was dismissed in 1938 under the Fascist racial laws and died the following year after trying to find a way to take his family to Argentina. She and her mother Maria moved to Rome, where they survived with false papers and in hiding.

She earned her doctorate in classics from the University of Rome with a thesis on Linear B; she published the first lexicon of the language in 1963.

In 1961 she moved to Washington, D.C., where she met the classical historian John K. Davies.  They married the following year, and both moved to Oxford.  The marriage was dissolved in 1978.

Academic career
In 1961 she became a post-doctoral fellow at Harvard University's Center for Hellenic Studies in Washington, D.C. where she formed a deep interest in theoretical linguistics; she was later to help establish a chair in the subject at Oxford University. She moved to Oxford in 1962, became a lecturer in Classical Philology in 1964, and spent the remainder of her career there with the exception of visiting professorships at the University of Pennsylvania, Yale University and the University of California at Berkeley and guest lecturing at the University of Cincinnati, Stanford University and Harvard University.

In 1966 Morpurgo Davies became a fellow of St Hilda's College; in 1971 she was appointed to the Chair in Comparative Philology and became a fellow of Somerville. In 2003 this became the Diebold Chair. She was also a Delegate of the Oxford University Press from 1992 to 2004, when she retired, as well as serving as President of the Philological Society (1976–80; thereafter Honorary Vice-president) and of the Henry Sweet Society for the History of Linguistic Ideas (1991-3, Vice President thereafter).

Research
Morpurgo Davies published in many areas of Indo-European grammar. She was particularly known as an expert in the Anatolian languages, and was one of the decipherers of Luwian hieroglyphs. She was also known for her work on Mycenaean Greek and on the development of linguistics in the nineteenth century; in 1996 she published an Italian-language history of the latter, La linguistica dell'Ottocento, and in 1998 she was responsible for the volume on that century in the Longman History of Linguistics, where a reviewer found she set aside the overall editorial aim of tracing the development of linguistic thought in favour of presenting a history of the development of Indo-European linguistics in Europe and the United States.

In 2005 a reviewer at The Times referred to her "trend-setting work in onomastics, Greek dialectology, Mycenaean lexicography, Anatolian languages, writing systems, history of scholarship and social history".

Honours 
Davies was made a fellow of the Society of Antiquaries of London in 1974 and of the British Academy in 1985. She was an honorary or corresponding member of the American Academy of Arts and Sciences, the Austrian Academy of Sciences, the Linguistic Society of America, the Academia Europaea, the American Philosophical Society, the French Académie des Inscriptions et Belles-Lettres, the Bavarian Academy of Sciences and Humanities, and the Italian Accademia dei Lincei. She became an honorary fellow of St Hilda's College in 1972 and was awarded honorary doctorates by the University of St Andrews and the University of Nancy.

In 2001, she became an honorary Dame Commander of the Order of the British Empire; since she was not a British citizen, she could not use the "Dame" title, but was able to use the post-nominals DBE.

In 2005 a festschrift was published in her honour, Indo-European Perspectives: Studies in Honour of Anna Morpurgo Davies.

After Davies' death, a joint annual lecture series organised by the British Academy and the Philological Society was named in her honour; the Philological Society also established an Anna Morpurgo Davies Bursary to support Master's students working on ancient languages.

Publications

Books

1963: Mycenaeae Graecitatis Lexicon. Roma: Edizioni dell'Ateneo.  
1966  –  1974-5:  (&  all. (eds.)). Studies  in Mycenaean Inscriptions  and  Dialect,  vols.  12–20.  London: Institute of Classical Studies. 
1973:  (with  J.D. Hawkins  &  G. Neumann). Hittite  Hieroglyphs  and  Luwian:  New  Evidence  for  the Connection. Göttingen: Vandenhoeck und Ruprecht. 
1976:  (with  W.  Meid,  eds.). Studies  in  Greek,  Italic  and  Indo-European  Linguistics,  offered  to  L.R. Palmer. Innsbruck: Innsbruck Institut für Sprachwissenschaft. 
1985: (with Y. Duhoux, eds.). Linear B. A 1984 Survey.  Louvain-la-Neuve: Cabay (reprinted: Louvain 1988: Peeters). 
1996: La  linguistica  dell'  Ottocento.   Bologna:  Il  Mulino  [Italian  translation  of  an  earlier  version  of the next title]. 
1998: Nineteenth-Century  Linguistics, vol.  4  of  G.  Lepschy  (ed.) History  of  Linguistics.  London: Longman.  
2008-14: (with Y. Duhoux, eds.). A Companion to Linear B. Mycenaean Greek Texts and their World, vol. 1 (2008), vol. 2 (2011), vol. 3 (2014). Louvain: Peeters.

Selected articles

Linear B and Mycenaean Greek 
1958: ‘Damar in Miceneo’. La Parola del Passato [PdP], 322–24. 
1960 b: ‘Il genitivo miceneo e il sincretismo dei casi’. Rendiconti dell' Accademia dei Lincei 15, 33–61. 
1961:  ‘L'esito delle nasali sonanti in miceneo’. Rendiconti dell' Accademia dei Lincei, 15, 321–36. 
1966:  ‘An  instrumental-ablative  in  Mycenaean?’.  In Proceedings  of  the  Cambridge  Colloquium  on Mycenaean  Studies (L.R.  Palmer  &  J.  Chadwick,  eds.),  191–202.  Cambridge:  Cambridge  University Press.  
1968  c:  ‘The  treatment  of  r  and  l  in  Mycenaean  and Arcado-Cyprian’.  In Atti  e  Memorie  del  Primo Congresso Internazionale di Micenologia, 791–814. Roma: Edizioni dell’Ateneo. 
1968 d: ‘Fabbri e schiavi a Pilo’. La Parola del Passato, 220–22. 
1972:  ‘Greek  and  Indo-European  semiconsonants:  Mycenaean u  and w’.  In Acta  Mycenaea,  vol.  2 (M.S. Ruipérez, ed.), 80–121. Salamanca: Universidad de Salamanca. 
1979  c:  ‘Terminology  of  power  and  terminology  of  work  in  Greek  and  Linear  B’.  In Colloquium Mycenaeum (E. Risch & H. Mühlestein, eds.), 87–108. Neuchatel: Neuchâtel, Faculté des Lettres. 
1983:  ‘Mycenaean  and  Greek  prepositions: o-pi,  e-pi  etc.’.  In Res  Mycenaeae.  Akten  des  VII.  Int. Mykenologischen Colloquiums (A. Heubeck & G. Neumann, eds.), 287–310. Göttingen: Vandenhoeck & Ruprecht.   
1985:  ‘Mycenaean  and  Greek  language’.  In Linear  B:  a  1984  Survey  (A.  Morpurgo  Davies  &  Y. Duhoux, eds.), 75–125. Louvain-la-Neuve: Cabay. 
1986  a:  ‘Forms  of  writing  in  the  ancient  Mediterranean  world’.  In The  Written  Word.  Literacy  in Transition (G. Baumann, ed.), 55–77. Oxford: Oxford University Press.  
1986 c: ‘The linguistic evidence: is there any?’.  In The end of the Early Bronze Age in the Aegean (G. Cadogan, ed.), 93–123. Leiden: Brill. 
1999   b:   ‘The   Morphology   of   personal   Names   in   Mycenaean   and   Greek:   Some observations’.   In Floreant   Studia   Mycenaea.   Akten   des   X.   internationalen   mykenologischen Colloquiums in Salzburg von 1-5 Mai 1995 (S. Deger-Jalkotzy, S. Hiller & O. Panagl, eds.), 389–405. Vienna: Oesterreichische Akademie der Wissenschaften. 
2006  a:  ‘Linguistic  evidence  from  the Thebes Texts in  Linear  B  (handout)’.  In Die  neuen  Linear  B-Texte aus Theben (S. Deger-Jalkotzy & O. Panagl, eds.), 119–24. Wien: Verlag der Oesterreichischen Akademie der Wissenschaften.  
1992 f: ‘Mycenaean, Arcadian, Cyprian and some questions of method in dialectology’. In Mykenaika (Suppl.  XXV  to Bulletin  de  correspondance  hellénique)  (J.P.  Olivier,  ed.),  415–32.  Athens  -  Paris: Ecole française d’Athènes.  
2012 a:  (& J.-P. Olivier). ‘Syllabic Scripts and Languages in the Second and First Millennia BC’. In Parallel Lives: Ancient Island Societies in Crete and Cyprus (G. Cadogan et al., eds.), BSA Studies 20, 105–18. London: BSA.  
2012  c:  ‘Open  problems  in  Mycenaean  phonology  and  the  Input  of  morphology’.  In Etudes mycéniennes 2010. Actes du XIIIe colloque international sur les textes égéens (Carlier, P. et al., eds.), 511–22. Pisa - Roma: Serra Editore.

Linear A and 'Minoan' 
1969 b: ‘The structure of the Minoan language’. Bulletin of the Institute of Classical Studies [BICS], London, 16, 161–62. 
1971 c: (& G. Cadogan). ‘A Linear A tablet from Pyrgos, Myrtos, Crete’. Kadmos 10, 105–09. 
1977: (& G. Cadogan). ‘A second Linear A tablet from Pyrgos’. Kadmos 16, 7–9.

Archaic and classical Greek linguistics 
1960 a: ‘Kτίλος (Pind. Pyth. II 17)’. Rivista di Cultura Classica e Medioevale [RCCM] 2, 30–40. 
1960 c: ‘Il genitivo maschile in -ας’. Glotta 39, 93–111. 
1964 a: ‘'Doric' features in the language of Hesiod’. Glotta 42, 138–65. 
1964 b: ‘SEG XI 1112 e il sincretismo dei casi in arcade-cipriota’. La Parola del Passato, 346–54. 
1965: ‘A note on Thessalian’. Glotta 43, 235–51. 
1968 a: ‘Thessalian patronymic adjectives’. Glotta 46, 85–106.    
1968 b: ‘Article and demonstrative: a note’. Glotta 46, 76–85. 
1968  e:  ‘Gender  and  the  development  of  the  Greek  declensions’. Transactions  of  the  Philological Society [TPhS] 67.1, 12–36. 
1969 a: ‘Epigraphical -φι’. Glotta 47, 46–54. 
1970  a:  (&  L.H.  Jeffery). ‘Ποινικαστάς  and ποινικάζεν.  BM  1969,  4-2.1.  A  new  archaic  inscription from Crete’. Kadmos 9, 118–54. 
1970 b: ‘Cretan δριωτον’. Classical Review [CR] 20, 280–82. 
1971  a: (&  L.H. Jeffery).  ‘An  archaic  Greek  inscription  from  Crete’. The  British  Museum  Quarterly 36, 24–29. 
1971 b: (& B. Levick). ‘Κοπτοπώλης’. Classical Review 21, 162–66. 
1976:  ‘The  -εσσι  datives,  Aeolic-  -ss-  and  the  Lesbian  poets’.  In Studies  L.R.  Palmer (A.  Morpurgo Davies & W. Meid, eds.), 181–197. Innsbruck: Innsbruck Institut für Sprachwissenschaft. 
1978  a:  ‘Thessalian εἴντεσσι  and  the  participle  of  the  verb  'to  be'’.  In Etrennes  de  Septantaine. Travaux offerts à M. Lejeune, 157–66. Paris: Klincksieck. 
1987  b:  ‘Folk-linguistics  and  the  Greek  word’.    In Festschrift  H.M.  Hoenigswald (G.  Cardona  &  N. Zide, eds.), 263-80 Tübingen: Narr. 
1993 a: ‘Geography, history and dialect: the case of Oropos’. In Dialectologica Graeca. Actas del II Coloquio Internacional  de Dialectologia  Griega  (E.  Crespo, J.L.  García  Ramón &  A.  Striano,  eds.), 261–79. Madrid: Universidad Autónoma de Madrid. 
1997: ‘Particles in Greek epigraphical texts: the case of Arcadian’. In New Approaches to Greek  Particles.  Proceedings  of  the  Colloquium  held  in  Amsterdam,  Jan.  4–6,  1996,  to  honour  C.J. Ruijgh on the occasion of his retirement (A. Rijksbaron, ed.), 49–73. Amsterdam: Gieben. 
1999 a [but 2000]: ‘Contatti interdialettali: il formulario epigrafico’. In KATA DIALEKTON. Atti del III  Colloquio  Internazionale  di  Dialettologia  Greca (A.C.  Cassio,  ed.)  =  A.I.O.N.  19  (1997),  7-33.  Napoli: Istituto Universitario Orientale. 
2000:  ‘Greek  personal  names  and  linguistic  continuity’.  In Greek  Personal  Names:  Their  Value  as Evidence (S. Hornblower & E. Matthews, eds.), 15–39. Oxford: Oxford University Press. 
2001:  ‘Après  Michel  Lejeune:  L’anthroponymie  et  l’histoire  de  la  langue  grecque’.  In Comptes-rendus de l’Académie des inscriptions et belles-lettres, no. 1, 157–73. Paris. 
2006 b: ‘Onomastics, diffusion and word formation: Greek Άριστογείτων and Άριστόγειτος’. In Studi Linguistici  in  onore  di  Roberto  Gusmani  (R.  Bombi  et  al.,  eds.),  1241–56.  Alessandria:  Edizioni dell’Orso. 
2012 d: ‘Phonetic laws, language diffusion, and drift: the loss of sibilants in the Greek dialects of the first  millennium  BC’.  In Laws  and  Rules  in  Indo-European  (P.  Probert  &  A.  Willi,  eds.),  102–21. Oxford: Oxford University Press.

Anatolian languages 
1975 a: ‘Negation and disjunction in Anatolian and elsewhere’. Anatolian Studies 25, 157–68. 
1978 d: (& J.D. Hawkins) a. ‘Il sistema grafico del luvio geroglifico’. In Annali della Scuola Normale di Pisa, 755–82.  
1978 e: (& J.D. Hawkins) b. ‘On the problems of Karatepe: the Hieroglyphic text’. Anatolian Studies 28, 103–19.  
1979 d: ‘The Luwian languages and the Hittite hi-conjugation’.  In Festschrift Oswald Szemerényi (B. Brogyanyi, ed.), 577–610. Amsterdam: Benjamins.  
1979  e:  (&  J.D.  Hawkins).  ‘The  hieroglyphic  inscription  of  Bohca’.  In Studia  mediterranea  Piero Meriggi dicata (O. Carruba, ed.), 387–406. Pavia: Centro Ricerche Egeo-Anatoliche, Aurora Edizioni. 
1980  a:  ‘The  personal  endings  of  the  Hieroglyphic  Luwian  verb’. Zeitschrift  für vergleichende Sprachforschung[KZ] 94, 86–108. 
1980 b: ‘Analogy and the an-datives of Hieroglyphic Luwian’. Anatolian Studies 30, 123–37. 
1982:  (&  J.D.  Hawkins).  ‘Buying  and  selling  in  Hieroglyphic  Luwian’.  In Serta  Indogermanica. Festschrift    G.    Neumann    (J.    Tischler,    ed.),    91–105.    Innsbruck:    Innsbruck    Institut    für Sprachwissenschaft. 
1982/3:   ‘Dentals,   rhotacism   and   Verbal   endings   in   the   Luwian   languages’. Zeitschriftfürvergleichende Sprachforschung [KZ] 96: 245–70. 
1986 d: ‘Fighting, ploughing and the Karkamiš kings’. In o-o-pe-ro-si. Festschrift Ernst Risch (A. Etter, ed.), 129–45. Berlin: de Gruyter. 
1986  e:  (&  J.D.  Hawkins).  ‘Studies  in  Hieroglyphic Luwian’.  In Kanišuwar.  A  tribute  to  Hans  G. Güterbock (H.A. Hoffner & G. Beckman, eds.), 69–81. Chicago: Oriental Institute.  
1987  a:  (&  J.D.  Hawkins).  ‘The  late  Hieroglyphic  Luwian  corpus:  some  new  lexical  recognitions’. Hethitica 8, 267–95. 
1993 b: (& J.D. Hawkins). ‘Running and relatives in Luwian’. Kadmos 32, 50–60. 
1998 a: (& J.D.Hawkins). ‘Of donkeys,  mules and Tarkondemos’.  In Mír curad. Studies in honor of Calvert Watkins (J. Jasanoff, H.C. Melchert & L. Oliver, eds.), 243–60. Innsbruck: Innsbruck Institut für Sprachwissenschaft. 
1998 b: ‘Sessanta anni (o cento) di linguistica anatolica’. In Il Geroglifico Anatolico. Atti del  Colloquio  e  della  tavola  rotonda  Napoli-Procida,  5-9  giugno  1995  (M.  Marazzi,  ed.),  219–57. Napoli: Istituto Universitario Orientale. 
2010:  (&  J.D.  Hawkins).  ‘More  negatives  and  disjunctives  in  Hieroglyphic  Luwian’.  In Ex  Anatolia Lux.  Anatolian  and  Indo-European  Studies  in  honor of  H.  Craig  Melchert (R. Kim  et  al.,  eds.),  98–128. Ann Arbor - New York: Beech Stave Press.  
2011:  ‘Philology  and  Linguistics:  when  data  meet  theory.  Two  case  studies:  I.  The  case  of Hieroglyphic Luwian’. Transactions of the Philological Society 109, 207–12.

History of linguistics 
1975 b: ‘Language classification in the nineteenth century’. In Current Trends in Linguistics, vol. 13 (T. Sebeok, ed.), 607–716. The Hague: Mouton.  
1975  c:  (&  J.D.  Hawkins).  ‘Hieroglyphic  Hittite:  Some  new  readings  and  their  consequences’. Journal of the Royal Asiatic Society [JRAS] 1975 (2), 121–33. 
1978  b:  ‘Analogy,  segmentation  and  the  early  Neogrammarians’. Transactions  of  the  Philological Society, 36–60. 
1994    a:    ‘Early    and    late    Indo-European    from    Bopp    to Brugmann’.    In Früh-,    Mittel-, Spätindogermanisch,  Akten der IX Fachtagung der Indogermanischen Gesellschaft (G.E. Dunkel, G. Meyer, S. Scarlata, C. Seidl, eds.), 245-65: Wiesbaden: Reichert. 
1994 b: ‘La linguistica dell'Ottocento’. In Storia della Linguistica, vol. 3, (G. Lepschy, ed.), 11-400. Bologna: Il Mulino (translation from English by F. Nassi). 
1986 b: ‘Karl Brugmann and late nineteenth-century linguistics’. In Studies in the History of Western Linguistics  in  Honour  of  R.H.  Robins  (Th.  Bynon  &  F.R.  Palmer,  eds.),  150–71.  Cambridge: Cambridge University Press. 
1987 c: ‘'Organic' and 'organism' in Franz Bopp’. In Biological Metaphor and Cladistic Classification -6- 
2004:  ‘Saussure  and  Indo-European  linguistics’.  In The  Cambridge  Companion  to  Saussure  (C. Sanders, ed.), 9-29. Cambridge: Cambridge University Press. 
2009 a: ‘Razza e razzismo: continuità ed equivoci nella linguistica dell’Ottocento’. In Lingue, ethnos e popolazioni: evidenze linguistiche, biologiche e culturali. Atti del convegno di Verona della Società Italiana di Glottologia (P. Cotticelli Kurras, G. Graffi, eds.), 55–82. Roma: Il Calamo. 
2009  b:  ‘Dynamic,  organic,  mechanical:  the  general significance  of  the  debate  about  Indo-European Ablaut  in  the  early  nineteenth  century.  In La  grammatica  tra  storia  e  teoria.  Scritti  in  onore  di Giorgio Graffi (P. Cotticelli Kurras & A. Tomaselli, eds.), 133–52. Alessandria: Edizioni dell’Orso.

References

External links

Davies' own memoir of her career (PDF), from Linguistics in Britain: Personal Histories, ed. Keith Brown & Vivien Law (2002)

1937 births
2014 deaths
People of Italian-Jewish descent
Writers from Milan
Fellows of Somerville College, Oxford
Fellows of St Hilda's College, Oxford
Fellows of the British Academy
Fellows of the Society of Antiquaries of London
Italian philologists
Women philologists
Linguists of Indo-European languages
Diebold Professors of Comparative Philology
Honorary Dames Commander of the Order of the British Empire
Italian classical scholars
Women classical scholars
Scholars of Greek language
Italian women academics
Sapienza University of Rome alumni
Italian emigrants to the United Kingdom
Women linguists
Members of the American Philosophical Society